Ghagra choli (also known as  lehenga choli and locally as chaniya choli) is a type of ethnic clothing for women from the Indian Subcontinent, notably in the Indian states of Rajasthan, Gujarat,  Madhya Pradesh, Uttar Pradesh, Bihar, Haryana, Punjab, Himachal Pradesh, Uttarakhand, Jammu and Kashmir, as well as in the Pakistani provinces of Punjab and Sindh. In Punjab, the lehenga is traditionally worn with a kurti. It is a combination of the gagra or lehenga (long skirt) and the choli (blouse), however in contemporary and modern usage lehenga choli is the more popular and widely accepted term by fashion designers, trend setters, and boutiques in South Asia, since ghagra is synonymous with the half-slip worn as an undergarment below the sari.

Terms and history

Historically, the gagra choli evolved from the three-piece attire worn by women in Indus Valley ancient India. The attire consisted of the antriya lower garment, the uttariya veil worn over shoulder or head and stanapatta a chest-band, which finds mentioned in Sanskrit literature and Buddhist Pali literature during the 6th century B.C.

Choli

A choli (Hindi: चोली), (ravike in South India Telugu: రవికె, Kannada: ರವಿಕೆ) is a midriff-baring blouse commonly worn with a sari attire (worn in India, Pakistan, Sri Lanka, Bangladesh, Nepal and other surrounding countries). It evolved from the ancient Stanapatta (also known as Kanchuki) and is cut to fit tightly to the body with its short sleeves and low neck. The choli is usually cropped, allowing exposure of the navel; the cropped design is particularly well-suited for wear in the hot summers of the Indian subcontinent.

Gagra

Lehenga, gagra/ghagra (Hindi: घाघरा ghāghrā) also chaniya (known as pavadai in Tamil: பாவாடை) is a form of skirt which is long, embroidered and pleated. It is secured at the waist or hips and leaves the lower back and midriff bare. The ancient version of skirt or ghagri evolved from bhairnivasani, which in turn evolved from the antriya when stitching on one side became tubular and was worn gathered together at the waist, and held by a girdle. This was one of the earliest forms of a clumsily stitched skirt. It was worn using a nada or drawstring.

Until the early 20th century, women irrespective of class largely wore gagras which reached down to ankles, especially in the Hindi belt. This was largely due to jeweled toes indicating the marital status of women, as both married and unmarried women observed the ghoonghat veil. Gagras were made out of two to three layers of coarse khadi fabric which created large flared look and remained largely plain but were decorated with gota and badla embroidery on special occasions. Most commonly used dyes were indigo, lac and turmeric. This style can still be seen in rural areas of Haryana, Uttar Pradesh, Bihar & Madhya Pradesh particularly during folk festivals.

Dupatta

The dupatta (Hindi: दुपट्टा,  or chunri (known as odni) is a scarf that is like a shawl and is worn with the gagra and choli. It is also used as part of the women's shalwar kameez costume. It is an evolved form of the Uttariya. Until the early 21st century, the dupatta was the most decorative part of gagra choli, while the rest of the garment was plainer, especially if the gagra was an everyday one. Dupatta is worn in many regional styles across India. The most common style since early medieval times was to pleat the dupatta on one end, so it can be anchored by tucking it into the front waist of the gagra. The loose end is then wrapped across the waist and/or draped diagonally across the upper body to fall over the shoulder, or up and over to cover the head. This is similar to the way a sari is generally worn. Women farming or doing manual work tuck both ends of the dupatta into their choli.

The dupatta is traditionally seen as a symbol of modesty, as its main purpose is to serve as a veil. There is no single way of wearing it, so as time passed and fashion changed, the styling of the dupatta also evolved.

Fabrics
The  Ghagri-Choli are made of a number of fabrics such as silk, cotton, khadi, georgette, crape, net, satin, brocade and chiffon. Although designers have successfully used various fabrics for lehenga, silk is still the preferred fabric.

Decorative stitching
Apart from the fabric, decorative stitching patterns also play a role. Lehengas come with a wide variety of decoration and embroidery work like Gota, Phulkari, Shisha, Chikankari, Zari, Zardozi, Nakshi, Kundan, etc. For festivals like Navratri, the ethnic Shisha embroidery is popular with a bit of patchwork. For formal wear and weddings, the embroidery is heavier in pearls, silk, sequins and zari.

Kutch embroidery is an evolving expression of the craft and textile traditions of the Rabaris, a nomadic tribe in Gujarat. Kutch embroidery is unique in the sense that a net is woven on a cloth using thread. The net is then filled in using the same thread by intricate interlocking stitches. The patterns are usually built around geometric shapes. This embroidery follows its own traditional design logic and juxtaposition of colours and motifs. The Rohanas tribals of Kutch specialise in skirt work. The Sodhas use a geometric style for their embroidery. The Garacia Jats are experts in tiny embroidery on the yoke, which intermingles with red, orange, blue and green threads. The Dhanetah Jats love embroidering broad pear-shaped mirrors using orange, black, yellow and red in chain stitch.

Festive attire
The lehenga choli is the favourite female apparel worn during festivals, weddings or special events in India. This is due to traditions as well as of the fact that it is available in a number of fabrics with many different decorative choices. Traditionally the sari and the lehenga choli are the most popular garments for the bride in India. This is a common bridal attire mostly in North India and is also the traditional wear of Garba festival in Gujarat.

Ritu Kala – significance in rite of passage

In southern India, coming of age ceremony or rites of passage (langa voni Telugu: లంగా వోని, Pattu Pavadai Tamil: பட்டு பாவாடை, Langa Davani Kannada: ಲಂಗ ದ್ವನಿ) are celebrated when a girl reaches puberty. She wears langa voni during the first part of the ceremony and then she is given her first sari, which she wears during the second half of the ceremony. This marks her transition into womanhood.

The tradition of presenting langa voni begins with the girl's first naming ceremony called Namakaran and her first rice feeding ceremony called Annaprashana. She receives her last one at her coming of age ceremony. Langa voni is traditional clothing for unmarried girls in southern India.

Luanchari

Luanchari (Hindi: लुआंचणी) is a full-dress garment. The luanchari is made up of two parts. The upper part is called choli, and is made of the same fabric as of the lehanga, but it is not uncommon to find the two pieces of the garment in different colours. The choli is stitched to the lehanga, to make a one-piece luanchari. This is commonly worn by the women in Pahari miniatures, and is quite similar to lehanga. It may take over 21 yards of cloth to make a complete luanchari. It is a traditional garment worn by Gaddis of Himachal Pradesh.

Images

See also 

 Langa voni
 Gharara
 Sari
 Shalwar kameez
Kurta

References

External links
 Information on ghagra choli 

Indian clothing
Saris
History of fashion
Gujarati culture
Rajasthani clothing